Mafia K-1 Fry sometimes stylized as Mafia K'1 Fry is a French collective of hip hop artists, rappers, beatboxers, DJs, MCs and music producers mostly coming from the Val-de-Marne and the Orly-Choisy-Vitry-Joinville axis (being locations in Orly - Choisy-le-Roi - Vitry-sur-Seine -Joinville-le-Pont), suburbs located south of Paris.

It was founded in 1995 with an initiative by Douma le Parrain. The name Mafia K'1 Fry comes from a rap verse during a freestyle improvised in à Orly at the "Demi-Lune": "Tu peux pas test avec la Mafia K'1 Fry," (You can't f*ck with the Mafia K'1 Fry") with "K'1 Fry" being a verlan term for africain, hence, translated into English, African Mafia. It was also known as "L'Union" and later "113 Clan". Las Montana was also a leader in the group that suffered from many legal problems as many of its members went to prison on certain charges. The members of Intouchable were hit by even bigger problems with a series of deaths of its members like Mamad, Las Montana and M.S.

The diverse group concentrated on Hip-Hop, but there were also breakdancers like Mokobé, Selim du 94 and Teddy Corona, graffiti artists like AP and Douma, backers like Las Montana, Mamad, Rocco, OGB, beatboxers like Mista Flo and DJs like DJ Mehdi and DJ Mosko.

Besides solo projects by many of its members, the collective realised two mini albums: Les Liens Sacrés and Légendaire before departure of Kery James in 2003 (he rejoined in 2007), and death of certain members most notably Las Montana and disappearance of M.S. Some members had big commercial success like 113 and Rohff and Intouchable (with Dry, Demon One and Mamad) before Mamad's death in 2003 just after the collective joint album La cerise sur le ghetto, which marked the release of music videos for "Pour ceux"  and "Balance" .

The period was marked by the departure of Popa Project and Rohff although keeping some nominal relations with the collective, with Rohff. In 2007, the collective released its biggest successful album Jusqu'à la mort (#7 in French albums chart). Mafia K'1 Fry will be releasing a new title in 2012.

Members
Refer to infobox on right

In popular culture
A documentary about the collective titled Si tu roules avec la Mafia K'1 Fry also found great success (both critically and commercially). The DVD release went platinum.
The collective launched its line of Mafia K'1 Fry clothing.

Discography
(Titles under the name of the collective. For individual albums, see various member pages)
1997: Les liens sacrés
1998: Légendaire
2003: La cerise sur le ghetto
2007: Jusqu'à la mort
Street Lourd Compilations
Street Lourd is a series of compilations from various members of Mafia K'1 Fry and guests. The initial compilation was released in 2004. A second series was released in 2010 with tracks and collaborations by Rohff, Kery James, Kool Shen, La Fouine, Sinik, Kamelancien, Soprano, Nessbeal, Sefyu, Rim'K, Mister You, Youssoupha, Tunisiano, Despo Ruti, Zesau, Meh, RR, Alkapote, Salif, Shone, SixCoups MC, Mista Flo, Seth Gueko, Alpha 5.20, AP (of 113), Nubi Sale, L.I.M, Selim du 94, Demon One, Dry, Boulox, Larsen, Arsenik (Lino and Calbo), Mam's Maniolo, Bushy, TLF (Ikbal, Karlito), OGB, Médine, Le Rat Luciano, Alonzo, Teddy Corona, Brasco, Ghetto Youss, Aketo, Niro, Skomoni

2004: Street Lourd Hall Stars
2010: Street Lourd Hall Stars II

Individual albums
1992: Ideal J - La vie est brutale
1995: Different Teep - La route est longue
1996: Ideal J - Original Mc's sur une mission
1996: Ideal J - Cash Remix
1996: Manu Key - Regarde moi bien toi
1997: Different Teep - La rime urbaine
1997: Opération coup de poing
1998: 113 - Truc de fou
1998: 113 - Ni barreau, ni barrière, ni frontière
1998: Ideal J - Le combat continue
1998: OGB - Rap offensif
1998: Manu Key - Manu Key
1998: Rohff - Le Code de l'honneur
1999: 113 - Les princes de la ville
2000: Manu Key - 94 Ghetto Vol.1
2000: Intouchable - Les points sur les i
2000: Manu Key -Manuscrit
2001: Karlito - Contenu sous pression
2001: Yezi l'Escroc - Les choses de la vie
2001: Intouchable - I have a dream
2001: Kery James - Si c'était à refaire
2001: 113 - 113 Fout la merde
2001: OGB - Vitry Club
2002: DJ Mehdi - The Story of Espion
2002: 113 - Dans l'urgence (réédition)
2002: Rohff - La vie avant la mort
2003: Rohff - Le son c'est la guerre
2004: Kery James - Savoir & vivre ensemble
2004: Rim'K - L'enfant du pays
2004: Intouchable - D'hier à aujourd'hui
2004: Rohff - 94
2004: Rohff - La fierté des nôtres
2004: Manu Key - Prolifique Vol.1
2004: DJ Mosko, Teddy Corona, Mista Flo - Street lourd hall stars
2005: Rohff - Charisme
2005: Kery James - D'hier à aujourd'hui
2005: Kery James - Ma vérité
2005: Rohff - Ça fait plaisir
2005: Intouchable - La vie de rêve
2005: OGB - OGBest of collector
2005: 113 - 113 Degrés
2005: Rohff - Au-delà de mes limites
2006: DJ Mehdi - Lucky Boy
2006: Manu Key - Street tape collector
2006: OGB - Enfermé dehors
2006: Karlito & No.nord - Ozas
2006: 113 - Illegal Radio
2007: DJ Mehdi - Lucky Boy at Night
2007: Rohff - Au dela de mes limites Classics (réédition)
2007: Manu Key - Prolifique Vol.2
2007: Mokobé - Mon Afrique
2007: OGB - Combien savent
2007: Rohff - Le Cauchemar Du Rap Français Vol 1
2007: Demon One - Mon Rap
2007: Rim'K - Famille Nombreuse
2008: DJ Mosko - DJ Mosko en mode Live
2008: Demon One - Démons & Merveilles
2008: Kery James - A l'ombre du show business
2008: Dry - De la pure pour les durs
2008: Mafia K'1 Fry - Légendaire (réédition)
2008: OGB & L'équipe - Esprit d'équipe
2008: Rohff - Le Code de l'horreur
2009: AP - Discret
2009: Manu Key - Collector
2009: Kery James - Réel
2009: Dry - Les derniers seront les premiers
2009: Rim'K - Maghreb United
2009: Rohff - Zénith Classics (CD/DVD Live)
2010: DJ Mosko, Teddy Corona, Mista Flo - Street lourd hall stars 2
2010: 113 - Universel 
2010: Rohff - La Cuenta 
2011: OGB - La Mémoire 
2011: Mokobé - Africa Forever
2012: Dry - Tôt ou Tard
2012: Demon One -  Les Fleurs du Mals
2012: Rohff -  Le Padre du Rap Game
2012: Kery James - 92-2012 (compilation)

References

External links
Mafia K'1 Fry Official website
Mafia K'1 Fry Clothing line
Mafia K'1 Frty SkyRock page
Mafia K-1 Fry Facebook
Street Lourd website

Musical collectives